Sweeny is a surname. It may also refer to:

 Sweeny Inlet, Antarctica
 Sweeny, Texas, United States, a city
 Sweeny High School (Texas)
 Clarence Williams (defensive end) (1946–2017), American football player nicknamed "Sweeny"
 The title character of Sweeny Toddler, a British comic strip published between 1973 and 2000
 Operation Sweeny, a 15 October 2003 anti-smuggling operation during the Iraq War

See also 
 Sweeney (disambiguation)